Arkhangelsky Design Bureau was a short-lived Soviet military aircraft design bureau headed by Alexander Arkhangelsky. Formerly working for Andrei Tupolev, Arkhangelsky was assigned his own bureau in 1940 to develop a dive-bomber version of the Tupolev SB (the Arkhangelsky Ar-2). The bureau was re-integrated into Tupolev the following year.

Aircraft
Arkhangelsky Ar-2

Aircraft manufacturers of the Soviet Union
1940 establishments in the Soviet Union
1941 disestablishments in the Soviet Union